Matthew Alexander McNeil (28 July 1927 – 23 April 1977) was a Scottish professional footballer who played as a centre half in the Football League for Barnsley, Brighton & Hove Albion, Norwich City and Newcastle United. He also made one appearance in the Scottish League for Hibernian.

Career statistics

References

Footballers from Glasgow
Scottish footballers
Hibernian F.C. players
English Football League players
Association football wing halves
Scottish Football League players
Newcastle United F.C. players
Barnsley F.C. players
Brighton & Hove Albion F.C. players
1927 births
1977 deaths
Norwich City F.C. players
Maryhill F.C. players
Scottish Junior Football Association players